The 1927 South American Championships in Athletics  were held in Santiago, Chile between 14 and 19 April.

Medal summary

Men's events

Medal table

External links
 Men Results – GBR Athletics
 Women Results – GBR Athletics

S
South American Championships in Athletics
International athletics competitions hosted by Chile
1927 in South American sport
1927 in Chilean sport